The  (Luxury Super Express) was an electric multiple unit (EMU) train type operated from December 1980 to July 2018 by Odakyu Electric Railway on "Romancecar" limited express services in Japan.

Design
The 7000 series LSE trains were the first new "Romancecars" introduced since the Odakyu 3100 series NSE 17 years previously. The overall styling represented an evolution of the 3100 series design, with 11 articulated cars mounted on shared bogies. The external livery of orange vermilion, grey, and white was also identical to that carried by the 3100 series. The passenger doors continued the folding style, but were automatically operated instead of the manually-operated doors of the 3100 series.

Operations
The 7000 series LSE sets are normally used on Hakone and Super Hakone services between Shinjuku and Hakone-Yumoto, and on Sagami services.

Formations

The four 11-car articulated sets are formed as follows, with car 1 at the Odawara and Hakone end.

Cars 2, 5, 7, and 10 each have one single-arm pantograph.

Interior

Passenger accommodation
Passenger accommodation consists of rotating/reclining pairs of seats arranged 2+2 abreast. All cars are no-smoking.

Facilities
Cars 4 and 8 have toilet and washing facilities. Cars 3 and 9 had refreshment counters, although since the 1990s, these are used as a base for trolley service sales.

History
The first set, 7001, was delivered in December 1980, and entered service on 27 December of the same year. One set was delivered each subsequent year, with the final set, 7004, delivered in December 1983.

In 1981, the 7000 series LSE was awarded the Blue Ribbon Award, presented annually in Japan by the Japan Railfan Club for railway vehicles voted as being the most outstanding design of the year.

The fleet was refurbished between 1995 and 1997 to improve accessibility, and new seat moquette was added. At the same time, the sets were repainted into a new livery of wine red and white based on that applied to the Odakyu 10000 series HiSE sets.

From 2005, the original scissors-type pantographs were replaced with single-arm pantographs.

In 2007, set 7004 was repainted back into its original livery to mark the 80th anniversary of Odakyu.

In 2012, one of the two sets still in new livery was repainted back into the original livery, and the other set was withdrawn as of 19 February 2012, leaving two sets in service, both in the original livery.

The last set was withdrawn from regular service on 10 July 2018 after it was used on the Home Way No. 83 service. The sets have been completely retired from service on 13 October 2018.

Train simulator version
The 7000 LSE is a player-driveable train in the 2001 Microsoft Train Simulator railroad simulator.

References

External links

 Odakyu Romancecar Lineup 

Electric multiple units of Japan
7000 series LSE
Articulated passenger trains
1500 V DC multiple units of Japan
Train-related introductions in 1980